Moses H. Cone is the textile entrepreneur known as The Denim King, but may refer to items that used his name in memory of him:

 Moses H. Cone Memorial Park
 Moses H. Cone Memorial Hospital
 Moses Cone Health System